Julia R. Hall (October 1, 1865 - April 28, 1918) was an American physician. Graduating from medical school in 1892, Hall was the first woman to work as a resident in the Howard University gynecology clinic. Her career as a physician lasted around fifty years.

Biography 
Hall was born in Dandridge, Tennessee on October 1, 1865. Hall and her husband, Reverend Jeremiah L. Hall, moved to Washington, D.C. in 1889. Hall graduated as the only woman in her class from Howard University in 1892. Hall was the first woman at Howard to work as a resident at the school's gynecology clinic. She also worked as a medical advisor to the women at Howard.

Overall, Hall's career in medicine lasted around 50 years. Hall died in Washington on April 28, 1918.

References 

1865 births
1918 deaths
Howard University College of Medicine alumni
People from Dandridge, Tennessee
People from Washington, D.C.
African-American women physicians
African-American physicians
20th-century African-American people
20th-century African-American women